The 2018 Paris–Roubaix was a road cycling one-day race that took place on 8 April 2018 in France. It was the 116th edition of the Paris–Roubaix and the fifteenth event of the 2018 UCI World Tour.

For the first time since Bernard Hinault in 1981, the race was won by the incumbent world champion, Peter Sagan. Sagan attacked the main group of riders, on sector 12 of pavé between Auchy-lez-Orchies and Bersée, catching the head of the race not long after. Only Swiss champion Silvan Dillier, riding for the  team, was able to stay with Sagan all the way to the finish at Roubaix Velodrome, where Sagan won the two-up sprint finish.

The race was marred by the death of  rider Michael Goolaerts. During the race, he suffered a cardiac arrest, and later died in hospital in Lille.

Teams
As Paris–Roubaix was a UCI World Tour event, all eighteen UCI WorldTeams were invited automatically and obliged to enter a team in the race. Seven UCI Professional Continental teams competed, completing the 25-team peloton.

Result

References

External links
 

2018 UCI World Tour
2018 in French sport
2018
April 2018 sports events in France